Xiangmihu station is a station on Line 1 of the Shenzhen Metro. It opened on 28 December 2004. It is located underground at Shennan Dadao, west of Xiangmei Lu near the entrance of Honey Lake Resort, in Futian District, Shenzhen, China. It is near Shenzhen Golf Club and Shenzhen Special Zone Press Tower.

Station layout

Exits

References

External links
 Shenzhen Metro Xiangmihu Station (Chinese)
 Shenzhen Metro Xiangmihu Station (English)

Railway stations in Guangdong
Shenzhen Metro stations
Futian District
Railway stations in China opened in 2004
Railway stations located underground in China